The Adršpach-Teplice Rocks (German: Adersbach-Weckelsdorfer Felsenstadt) are an unusual set of sandstone formations covering 17 km2 in northeastern Bohemia, Czech Republic.
They are named after two nearby municipalities: Adršpach, and Teplice nad Metují.

The site was apparently a regional destination during the 19th and early 20th century, as attested by the varied language of stone inscriptions on the site, and surviving postcards.

The rocks have been protected as a national nature reserve since 1933, and since 1991 the whole adjacent region of Broumovsko has enjoyed the status of protected landscape area.
Tourists may visit the rocks via a number of marked trails. The area is a popular destination for rock climbers.

In recent years, it has become a focus for the high-risk climbing-related sport of rock jumping.

The area is also one of the largest permanent breeding sites of peregrine falcon in Europe, as they are protected here under federal law.  Some areas have been designated off limits to climbers and hikers to make sure the birds aren't disturbed.

Gallery

References

External links

 Photo gallery
 Adršpach-Teplice Rocks - virtual show
 Adršpach Rocks Picture
 Adršpach-Teplice Rocks
 Adršpach-Teplice Rocks
 Adršpach-Teplice Rocks

Climbing areas of the Czech Republic
Náchod District
Rock formations of the Czech Republic
Geography of the Hradec Králové Region
Tourist attractions in the Hradec Králové Region
Articles containing video clips